Judith Palfrey (born 1945) is the T. Berry Brazelton Professor of Pediatrics at Harvard Medical School and the author of Community Child Health: An Action Plan for Today (1995) and Child Health In America:  Making A Difference Through Advocacy (2006), and co-editor of Global Child Health Advocacy (2014) and the Disney Encyclopedia of Baby and Childcare (1995).  She is also the former Faculty Dean of Adams House at Harvard University along with her husband Sean Palfrey who is also a pediatrician in Boston.

Palfrey is a 1967 graduate of Radcliffe College. She received her MD in 1971 from the Columbia College of Physicians and Surgeons.  She completed an internship and residency in pediatrics at Albert Einstein College of Medicine and a fellowship in community child health at Children's Hospital Boston.  She was chief of the Division of General Pediatrics at Children's Hospital Boston for 22 years. In 2008 she was named President-Elect of the American Academy of Pediatrics for 2009-2010. From September to December 2011, Palfrey was executive director of Michelle Obama's Let's Move! initiative. Currently, she is the director of the Global Pediatrics Program at Boston Children's Hospital.

Her eldest, John Palfrey, previously a professor and Vice Dean of Harvard Law School before becoming Head of School at Phillips Academy, is now President of the MacArthur Foundation. Her middle child, Quentin Palfrey, ran for Lieutenant Governor of Massachusetts and is the former Executive Director of J-PAL. Her youngest, Katy Palfrey, is the CEO of Conservation Centers for Species Survival (C2S2).

Major publications
Palfrey J.S. (1995) Community Child Health: An Action Plan for Today  
Katz S.L., New M.I., Palfrey J.S. and Schulman I. (1995) The Disney Encyclopedia of Baby and Child Care  
Palfrey J.S. (2006) Child Health in America. Making a Difference Through Advocacy   
Palfrey, J.S. (editor) (2014) Global Child Health Advocacy

References

1945 births
Harvard Medical School faculty
Radcliffe College alumni
Columbia University Vagelos College of Physicians and Surgeons alumni
Living people
Albert Einstein College of Medicine alumni